Hijacker is the name of two fictional characters appearing in American comic books published by Marvel Comics.

The two Hijackers were gimmick-laden villains who specialized in stealing technology for later resale in criminal auctions.

Publication history
The first Hijacker first appeared in Tales to Astonish #40 (February 1963), and was created by Stan Lee, Larry Lieber and Jack Kirby. The character subsequently appears in Marvel Two-In-One #24 (Feb. 1976), #96 (Feb. 1983), and Captain America #319 (July 1986), in which he was killed by the Scourge of the Underworld.

Fictional character biography

Howard Mitchell
Originally the owner of an armored car company, Mitchell adopted the masked alias of Hijacker to steal the cargo his cars were transporting and thus mend the financial difficulties of his firm. He was first defeated by Ant-Man, and later by Black Goliath and the Thing.  He was good at last-moment "rabbit out of the hat" tricks that no one expected. He returned for vengeance on the Thing after the hero was hospitalized. He used a tank similar in appearance to his last one, but it was not as durable and Iron Man made quick work of it.

Hijacker attended the "Bar With No Name" massacre. Without his gimmicks and protection, he proved easy prey for the Scourge of the Underworld.

During the Dark Reign storyline, Hijacker was later among the eighteen criminals, all murdered by the Scourge, to be resurrected by Hood using the power of Dormammu as part of a squad assembled to eliminate the Punisher. He carries over a dozen different kinds of gases in his backpack, and has his giant impenetrable tank. Hijacker chases the Punisher in his tank, but the Punisher escapes by using Pym particles to shrink down and get into the tank; after taking control of the tank, Punisher crashes it into the building where Basilisk was holding G.W. Bridge and uses the gases on Basilisk.

In the cleanup following the Spider-Island storyline, he attempted an opportunistic bank heist, but was noticed and pursued by Venom. During the chase, he accidentally ran over a mother and her child causing Flash to lose his temper and bites Hijacker's head off.

Mercenary
The second Hijacker is an unnamed mercenary who took on the mantle when he bought vehicle-upgrading nanites from Overdrive. He was one of the numerous henchmen available through Power Broker II's Hench App. His first job came when Slug hired him through the app in order to steal a Giganto egg from a S.H.I.E.L.D. cargo ship. While taking control of the S.H.I.E.L.D. cargo ship, Hijacker ended up in a fight against Captain America and Ant-Man where Hijacker was knocked out by Captain America. Ant-Man (Scott Lang) would later employ Hijacker's services as part of Ant-Man Security Solutions in an attempt to hack (and later combat) Darren Cross and his Cross Technological Enterprises. Hijacker parted ways with Lang when Ant-Man was arrested and his security company was shut down.

Equipment
The first Hijacker gained his abilities from his heavy body-suit, which provided the power for his weapons. His heavy, brown, reinforced fabric suit provided protection against physical, energy, heat, fire, and cold attacks. When sealed with his odd-looking helmet, Hijacker had his own 4-hour oxygen supply and was immune to gases. Hijacker's main weapon was a multifunction gun called a "Vario-Blaster", attached to the belt of his outfit by a cable. With his weapon, Hijacker could fire: "nuclear flame", knock-out nerve gas, damaging projectiles, ionic blasts, and an "activator beam" which activated any nearby machinery. Hijacker's "Crime-Tank" was a heavily armored fort on spiked treads. This mobile base was an off-road vehicle, and had electromagnets as weapons. This tank was destroyed by Thing and Black Goliath.

The second Hijacker bought special nanites from Overdrive.

References

External links
 Hijacker at Marvel Wiki
 

Characters created by Jack Kirby
Characters created by Larry Lieber
Characters created by Stan Lee
Comics characters introduced in 1963
Marvel Comics male supervillains